Sarkom is a village in Rudkhaneh Rural District, Rudkhaneh District, Rudan County, Hormozgan Province, Iran. At the 2006 census, its population was 65, consisting of 16 families.

References 

Populated places in Rudan County